The molecular formula C19H12O2 (molar mass: 272.30 g/mol) may refer to:

 alpha-Naphthoflavone (7,8-benzoflavone)
 beta-Naphthoflavone (5,6-benzoflavone)